Marcel Schug (born 20 December 1984) is a German former professional footballer who played as an attacking midfielder in the 3. Liga for 1. FC Saarbrücken and SV Elversberg.

External links

1984 births
Living people
3. Liga players
People from Bad Kreuznach
German footballers
Footballers from Rhineland-Palatinate
Association football midfielders
BFV Hassia Bingen players
SC Freiburg players
1. FC Saarbrücken players
SV Elversberg players